Trill is the debut studio album by American rapper Bun B. It was released on October 18, 2005, by Rap-a-Lot Records, Asylum Records and Atlantic Records. The record serves as Bun B's first studio release going solo, after spending years among years as a member of the Southern hip hop duo UGK throughout the most of his rap career. The album debuted at number six on the Billboard 200, with first-week sales of 118,000 copies in the United States.

Trill was supported by three singles: "Draped Up" featuring Lil' Keke, "Git It" featuring Ying Yang Twins, and "Get Throwed" featuring Pimp C, Young Jeezy, Z-Ro and Jay-Z.

Critical reception

Track listing

Charts

Weekly charts

Year-end charts

References

2005 debut albums
Albums produced by Jazze Pha
Albums produced by Lil Jon
Albums produced by Maejor
Albums produced by Mannie Fresh
Albums produced by Mike Dean (record producer)
Albums produced by Mr. Collipark
Asylum Records albums
Atlantic Records albums
Bun B albums
Rap-A-Lot Records albums